Colonel General Nikandr Evlampievich Chibisov (November 5 (O.S. October 24), 1892 in stanitsa Romanovskaya (Rostov Oblast) – 20 September 1959 in Minsk) was a Soviet military commander and Hero of the Soviet Union (1943).

In popular culture
General Fotii Kobrisov, the protagonist of the 1994 novel The General and His Army by Georgi Vladimov, was based on Chibisov. The book focused on the Battle of Moscow (1941) and the Battle of Kiev (1943). The novel differed from the real-life biography of Chibisov in that he did not take part in the former. The book was awarded the Russian Booker Prize in 1995 and the Sakharov Prize in 2000.

References

External links
 generals.dk page on Chibisov

1892 births
1959 deaths
People from Rostov Oblast
People from Don Host Oblast
Heroes of the Soviet Union
Soviet colonel generals
Soviet military personnel of World War II
Russian people of World War II
Recipients of the Order of the Red Banner
Recipients of the Order of Suvorov, 1st class
Commandants of the Frunze Military Academy